Purser is an occupational surname, denoting a maker of purses, or a treasurer or bursar. 

Notable persons with that surname include:

Andrew Purser (born 1958), Australian rules footballer
Ben Purser (born 1990), Australian basketball player
Cecil Purser (1862–1953), Australian physician
Dorothy Ann Purser (21st century), American screenwriter
Frederick Purser (1839–1910), Irish mathematician
John Purser (born 1942), Scottish composer
John Purser (mathematician) (1835–1903), Irish mathematician
Louis Claude Purser (1854–1932), Irish translator
Philip Purser (1925–2022), British novelist
Sarah Purser (1848–1943), Irish artist
Wayne Purser (born 1980), English footballer

Occupational surnames
English-language occupational surnames